The  is the prefectural parliament of Hokkaido.

History
In April 2019, Ayako Fuchigami was elected to this assembly, becoming the first openly transgender person elected to a Japanese prefectural assembly.

Members
As of 3 September 2019

A list of past members is available at the assembly's website.

References

External links

北海道議会 (Japanese)

Prefectural assemblies of Japan
Politics of Hokkaido